Sasha Calle (born August 7, 1995) is an American actress. She is known for her role as Lola Rosales on the CBS soap opera The Young and the Restless, which earned her a Daytime Emmy Award nomination. She will portray Supergirl in the DC Extended Universe in The Flash, which will also serve as her feature film debut.

Early life and education
Sasha Calle was born in Boston, Massachusetts. She is of Colombian descent. She has a younger brother. She and her mother moved to Colombia when she was ten and moved back to the U.S. after two years. Calle is a graduate of the American Musical and Dramatic Academy, where she obtained a Bachelor of Fine Arts degree.

Career
In September 2018, Calle joined the cast of the soap opera The Young and the Restless as chef Lola Rosales. She received a Daytime Emmy Award nomination for Outstanding Younger Performer in a Drama Series in 2020 for her performance. In February 2021, Calle was cast in her first film role to portray Supergirl in the DC Extended Universe, beginning with the film The Flash, which is set for a June 2023 release. She will be the first Latina actress to play the role.

Filmography

Film

Television

Accolades

References

External links

21st-century American actresses
21st-century Colombian actresses
Actresses from Boston
American expatriates in Colombia
American people of Colombian descent
American soap opera actresses
American television actresses
Hispanic and Latino American actresses
Living people
Year of birth missing (living people)